Malartic is a town on the Malartic River in northwestern Quebec, Canada, in the La Vallée-de-l'Or Regional County Municipality.

In addition to the main settlement of Malartic, the municipality also includes the smaller settlement of Norrie.

History
At the time when the Abitibi region was being surveyed and organized in 1907, the name Malartic was chosen for the geographic township and lake, following the pattern of assigning names of regiments and officers of General Montcalm's army. It was named after Anne Joseph Hippolyte de Maurès, Comte de Malartic, aide de camp to Montcalm.

The discovery of major gold deposits in 1923 led to a gold rush in the Abitibi region, attracting settlers (exclusively men during the first six years) to the area in 1928. In 1935, the Canadian Malartic Gold Mines began operation, employing people from all over the province, Canada, and several east European countries. Together with Eastern Malartic and Malartic Goldfields that began operating in 1937 and 1939 respectively, these three became Quebec's largest gold mines. But newly arriving workers were not permitted to settle near the mines and would build a squatter camp on Crown land about 4 km (2½ miles) north of Malartic, that became the community of Roc d'Or. The two settlements grew concurrently, duplicating services. But the parishes (Saint-Martin-de-Tours in 1928), railway station, and post office (1936) were established near the mines in Malartic.

In 1939, the Town of Malartic was incorporated under the auspices of the Quebec Ministry of Mines, in an attempt to halt the proliferation of squatter camps in the Abitibi region. In 1943, the entire community of Roc d'Or was ordered to move to Malartic by the provincial government and the settlement was demolished. Despite a mining accident in April 1947 that killed 12 miners in an underground fire, Malartic was thriving throughout the 1950s, reaching a peak of nearly 7000 residents.

But in 1965, Canadian Malartic and Malartic Goldfields closed their mines, followed by the Barnat and East Malartic mines in the 1980s. This led to rapid decline in the economy and population.

In 2008 and 2009, renewed exploration by Osisko Mining revealed an untapped new gold deposit, estimated at approximately 9 million ounces, beneath the town. The company received approval from the government of Quebec to launch what would become Canada's largest ever open pit gold mine. The project, which will have an estimated cost of $1 billion if approved, would see most of the portion of the town lying south of Route 117, consisting of about 200 houses and several of the town's public facilities, relocated to a new housing development in the north end of town. This move was featured in season 4 of the television show Monster Moves. As of late 2009, most of the relocation work had been completed, and this, before the end of public consultations by Quebec's Ministry of Sustainable Development, Environment and Parks.

Government
As of January 2011, the municipal government consists of mayor André Vezeau and councillors Jude Boucher, Sylvie Daigle, Martin Ferron, Daniel Magnan, Guy Morrissette, and Jean Turgeon.

Federally, Malartic is located in the electoral district of Abitibi—Baie-James—Nunavik—Eeyou, currently represented in the House of Commons of Canada by Sylvie Bérubé of the Bloc Québécois. Provincially, it is in the district of Abitibi-Est, represented in the National Assembly of Quebec by Pierre Dufour of the Coalition Avenir Québec.

Demographics 

Mother tongue:
 English as first language: 4.2%
 French as first language: 90.3%
 English and French as first language: 0.6%
 Other as first language: 4.9%

Notable people 
 Yves Bergeron, ice hockey winger
 Michel Brière, ice hockey centre
 Marcel Côté, economist and politician
 Robbie King, organist
 Jim Watson, ice hockey defenseman

Education
 École Des Explorateurs – Kindergarten to grade six
 École Secondaire Le Tremplin – secondary grades one to five
 Trait d'Union – adult education

References

External links 

  Ville de Malartic

Cities and towns in Quebec
Incorporated places in Abitibi-Témiscamingue
Mining communities in Quebec
1928 establishments in Quebec